Binge (stylized in all caps) is the second extended play by American rapper Machine Gun Kelly. It was released on September 21, 2018 under Bad Boy Records and Interscope Records. The EP includes a sole guest appearance from 24hrs, along with the single "Rap Devil", a diss track directed at Eminem.

Critical reception

Binge received generally negative reviews, with critics citing lack of lyrical content, unique sound, and the artist's dependence on his feud with Eminem as reasons for low ratings. As a result, the EP has only one star on the U.S iTunes store.

Commercial performance
In the United States, the EP debuted at number 24 on the Billboard 200, with first-week sales of 21,519 copies. It dropped to number 111 on the Billboard 200 in its second week selling 14,000 copies, and fell off completely in its third week.

Track listing 
Credits adapted from Tidal.

Notes
 All track titles are stylized in all caps.

Charts

References

2018 EPs
Machine Gun Kelly (musician) albums
Bad Boy Records EPs
Interscope Records EPs
Albums produced by Ronny J
Albums produced by Hit-Boy
Albums produced by Honorable C.N.O.T.E.
Trap music albums